Samuel Pancotti (born 31 October 2000) is a Sammarinese professional footballer who plays as a forward for PDRM in Malaysia Super League and the San Marino national team.

Career
Pancotti made his international debut for San Marino on 17 November 2022 in a friendly match against Saint Lucia, which finished as a 1–1 away draw.

Career statistics

International

References

2000 births
Living people
Sammarinese footballers
San Marino youth international footballers
San Marino under-21 international footballers
San Marino international footballers
Association football forwards